Adalberto Santiago (born April 23, 1937, in Pozas barrio, Ciales, Puerto Rico) is an internationally known salsa singer.

Career
Adalberto's relaxed and flawless lead vocals are among the best in the salsa genre of Latin music. His early influences included the great Cuban vocalists Beny Moré and Miguelito Cuní. Santiago started his professional career singing with trios and playing guitar and bass. After stints with the bands of Chuíto Vélez, where he was called "The Puerto Rican Elvis Presley", Willie Rosario and Willie Rodriguez, his career reached new heights when he joined Ray Barretto's band. Between 1966 and 1972, Adalberto made seven studio albums with Ray Barretto, that contained hit songs like "Quitate La Mascara" and "Alma Con Alma". During this time period he also became an original founding member of the salsa "super-group" The Fania All-Stars. In late 1972, Adalberto and four other members of Barretto's band departed to found Típica 73. He appeared on three of their albums before disagreement over musical direction led him, and three other band members, to split during the mid-1970s to form Los Kimbos. Santiago sang lead vocals on charanga albums, Fantasía Africana/African Fantasy and Our Heritage - Nuestra Herencia, by flautist, composer and producer Lou Pérez.

Los Kimbos had a similar sound to both the pre-split Ray Barretto and Típica 73 outfits. With Los Kimbos, Adalberto recorded Los Kimbos (1976) and The Big Kimbos With Adalberto Santiago (1977). That year he also made his solo debut on Adalberto, which was produced by Barretto. Los Kimbos continued under the leadership of Orestes Vilató. Santiago sang lead on one track on Louie Ramírez y Sus Amigos by Louie Ramírez. In 1979, Adalberto and Ramírez co-produced his solo follow-up, Adalberto Featuring Popeye El Marino. The same year, he reunited with Barretto on Rican/Struction. Barretto produced Adalberto's next solo album, Feliz Me Siento (1980). Sonora Matancera member, Javier Vázquez, produced, arranged, directed and played piano on Adalberto Santiago, which was Adalberto's contribution to the early 1980s típico salsa revival. In 1982, Santiago joined with Roberto Roena for Super Apollo 47:50. Santiago then co-produced Calidad with Papo Lucca, who also played piano, and oversaw musical direction. His Cosas Del Alma was an album of boleros which included his third recorded version of "Alma Con Alma" (which was previously contained on Barretto's The Message and Gracias ), and featured arrangements made by Steve Sacks, Ray Santos and Alberto Naranjo, among others. He returned to Salsa Dura in 1985 on Más Sabroso.

Adalberto did his own version of salsa romántica on Sex Symbol, with production, arrangements, musical direction and piano by Isidro Infante. This album produced one of Santiago's biggest solo hit songs "La Noche Mas Linda Del Mundo". In 1990, he again performed "Alma Con Alma", this time arranged by Infante in a salsa romántica style for Louie Ramírez's second album entitled Louie Ramírez y Sus Amigos.

Santiago has written songs for a number of the albums on which he has appeared, both as lead singer and solo artist, and provided compositions for other artists to record, such as Joe Cuba. He has appeared in Robin Williams's movie Moscow on the Hudson, and provided music for Al Pacino's Carlito's Way as well as appearing as himself in the film Our Latin Thing and the Academy Award winning documentary Summer Of Soul.

Adalberto, now in his 80s, continues to record and perform in the US, Europe, and South America. In 2022 he recorded a Trap / Reggaeton style song "Quitate" with noted rappers Jon Z. and Nengo Flow. His discography is at 100 and counting. He is celebrating more than 60+ years as a professional musician. He resides in his native Puerto Rico and in New York City. His nephews Johnny Rivera and Tony Vega are also notable salsa singers.

Discography

Solo 
 Adalberto. Fania Records; 1977
 Adalberto Santiago Featuring Popeye El Marino. Fania Records JM 536; 1979
 Feliz Me Siento. Fania Records; 1980
 Adalberto Santiago. Fania Records; 1981
 Calidad. Fania Records; 1982
 Cosas del Alma. WS Latino 4163, 1984
 Más Sabroso. Budda Records 011; 1985
 Fania Dancing Club Collection #7. Fania Records; 1985
 Sex Symbol. Mayor Music 001; 1989
 Hay Algo En Ella. JV Music 001; 1991
 Romantico Y Salsero, Exitos. La Ola Musical; 2009
 Exitos. Edenways Records EDE 1310-1; 2010

With Chuito Velez 
 Chuito Velez. Chuito Velez Y Sus Estrellas Boricuas. La Flor Records; 1958
 Chuito Velez. Hojas Muertas. DECCA Records; 1960
 Chuito Velez. Si Pancha Plancha. La Flor Records; 1962
 Chuito Velez. A Go-Go. SEECO Records; 1964

With Ray Barretto 
 Ray Barretto. Latino Con Soul. WS Latino 4053; 1966
 Ray Barretto. Acid. Fania Records LP 346; 1967
 Ray Barretto. Hard Hands. Fania Records LP 362; 1968
 Ray Barretto. Together. Fania Records LP 378; 1969
 Ray Barretto. Barretto Power. Fania Records 391; 1970
 Ray Barretto. The Message. Fania Records SLP 403; 1971
 Ray Barretto. From The Beginning. Fania Records; 1971
 Ray Barretto. Qué Viva la Música. Fania Records 427; 1972
 Ray Barretto. Barretto Live In New York: Tomorrow. Messidor Records 15950; 1976 *GRAMMY NOMINATION*
 Ray Barretto. Energy To Burn. Fania Records; 1977
 Ray Barreto. Gracias. Fania Records JM 528; 1979
 Ray Barretto. Rican/Struction. Fania Records JM 552; 1979
 Ray Barretto, Celia Cruz, Adalberto Santiago. Tremendo Trío!. Fania Records 623; 1983 *GRAMMY NOMINATION*
 Ray Barretto. The Giant Of Salsa, Live 50th Anniversary. AJ Records-Sony Discos; 2001

With Típica 73 
 Típica 73. Típica 73. Inca Records SLP; 1973
 Típica 73 (Stock Certificate Cover). Típica 73. Inca Records SLP; 1974
 Típica 73. La Candela. Inca Records SLP 1043; 1975
 Típica 73. Típica 73...74...75...76. Inca Records; 1978
 Típica 73. Típica 73 Live. AJ Records; 2002

With Los Kimbos 
 Los Kimbos con Adalberto Santiago. Cotique CS 1083; 1976
 The Big Kimbos with Adalberto Santiago. Cotique CS 1091; 1977

With The Fania All Stars 
 Fania All Stars. Live at the Red Garter, Vol. 1&2 (2LPs). Fania Records; 1968
 Fania All Stars. Our Latin Thing. Fania Records SLP 431; 1972
 Fania All Stars. Fania All Stars Live At The Cheetah Vol. 1&2 (2LPs). Fania Records SLP 00415 y SLP 00416; 1972
 Fania All Stars. Super Salsa Singers, Vol. 1&2 (2LPs). Fania Records; 1977
 Fania All Stars. Greatest Hits. Fania Records; 1977
 Fania All Stars. Habana Jam. Fania Records FA 116; 1979
 Fania All Stars. Commitment. Fania Records 564; 1980
 Fania All Stars. Latin Connection. Fania Records; 1981
 Fania All Stars. Lo Que Pide La Gente. Fania Records JM 629; 1984
 Fania All Stars. Live In Puerto Rico, June 1994. Fania Records 684; 1995
 Fania All Stars. Viva Colombia: En Concierto (2 CD). Latina 225; 1997
 Fania All Stars. Hommage A Jerry Masucci. Sonido Inc.; 1997
 Fania All Stars. Bravo 97. Sony 82351; 1997
 Fania All Stars. Hot Sweat, The Best Of Live. Vampisoul Records;2005 
 Fania All Stars. Campeones. Codigo Music; 2010
 Fania All Stars. Ponte Duro. Fania Records; 2010

Contributions 
 Willie Rosario. Boogaloo y Guaguanco. ATCO Records; 1968
 Willie Rodriguez. Colorin Colorao. Fonseca Records; 1968 
 Willie Rodriguez. Heat Wave. Fonseca Records; 1969
 Larry Harlow. Hommy, A Latin Opera. Fania Records; 1973 
 Impacto Crea. Christmas. VAYA Records; 1973
 Impacto Crea. Cobarde. VAYA Records; 1974
 Lou Perez. Fantasia Africana. WSL Records; 1975
 Lou Perez. Nuestra Herencia. TICO Records; 1976
 Pancho Cristal. Super Típica De Estrellas. All-Art Records; 1976 
 Andy Harlow. Pura Salsa! Con Lo Mejor De Andy Harlow. Discos Completo, S.A.; 1977
 Louie Ramírez. Louie Ramírez Y Sus Amigos. Cotique Records 1096; 1978
 Linda Leida. Electricando Linda. TR Records; 1978
 Tito Puente. Homenaje A Beny More, Vol 1&2 (2 LP's). TICO Records; 1979 *GRAMMY WINNER*
 Mario Allison. A Fondo. FTA Records; 1979
 Louie Ramírez. Salsero. Cotique Records 1104; 1980
 Artistas de La Fania. Aeropuerto 81. Fania Records; 1980
 Roberto Roena y su Apollo Sound. Super Apollo 47:50. Fania Records LP 609; 1982
 Celia Cruz & Tito Puente. Homenaje A Beny More. VAYA Records; 1985
 Alfredo Rodriguez. Monsieur Oh La La. Caiman Records; 1985 
 Alfredo Valdes Jr. Charanga Ranchera. The Mayor Records; 1989
 Isidro Infante. Salsa Sudada. Valdesa Records; 1990
 Louie Ramirez. Louie Ramirez Y Sus Amigos. CaChe Records; 1990 
 Linda Ronstadt. Frenesi. Elektra, Rhino; 1992 *GRAMMY WINNER*
 Candido Antomattei. Candido Y Las Super Estrellas. La Plata Records; 1994
 Orquesta Inmensidad. La Danza De Los Millones. Orlcon Records; 1995
 David Rothschild. Lookin'Up!. Via Jazz Records; 1998
 Larry Harlow. Larry Harlow's Latin Legends Band 1998. Sony Music; 1998  
 Various Artists. Coleccion Estelar De Salsa Dura. BCI Latino: 2000
 Son 80s. Live At S.O.B.s. Exclusivo Records; 2001 
 David Gonzalez with Larry Harlow. Sofrito. RainArt Productions; 2001
 Papo Lucca. Festival De Boleros. Flowmusic; 2002
 Jazz Hamilton. Jazz Hamilton Y Las Estrellas Del Pueblo. La Rosevelt Records; 2004 
 Homenaje A Frankie Ruiz. Va Por Ti Frankie! Sony Music; 2004
 Johnny Pacheco. Entre Amigos. Bronco Records; 2005 
 Ralph Irizarry & Soncafe. Tribute. BKS Records; 2006
 Various Artists. FANIA Soneros De Siempre Vol. 1. Universal Music; 2006 
 Johnny Cruz. Back To The Classics. Tiffany Records; 2006
 Larry Harlow. Larry Harlow's Latin Legends Of Fania. Image Entertainment; 2007
 Mario Ortiz All-Star Band. Tributo A Mario Ortiz. Sony Music; 2009
 Luis Gonzalez. Tributo A Un Gigante. Tsunami Records; 2010
 Estrellas De La Salsa. 25 Aniversario Tropical Budda Records Vol. 1. West Side Beat; 2011
 Tribute To Ray Barretto. La Era Del Palladium. Sony Music; 2011
 Alfredo De La Fe & Rodry-Go. Sin Limites. No Borders Entertainment; 2013
 Edwin Clemente. Dos Generaciones En Salsa. Epacaje Records; 2015
 Orquesta Abran Paso. Back To The 70s. Abran Paso Records; 2015
 Orquesta Abran Paso. Salsa Radio-Activa. Abran Paso Records; 2019
 Johnny Cruz. Trayectoria De Clasicos. Cruz Music Inc.; 2019
 Orquesta Abran Paso. Clasicos En Vivo Vol. 1. Abran Paso Records; 2021

See also
List of Puerto Ricans
Fania Records

References

External links
 Artists : Fania
 Adalberto Santiago
 Adalberto Santiago - AmericaSalsa.com
 Adalberto Santiago
 Fania - Adalberto Santiago
 Una Semblanza de Adalberto Santiago

1937 births
Living people
20th-century Puerto Rican male singers
People from Ciales, Puerto Rico
Salsa musicians
Fania Records artists